Handschinia is a genus of true bugs belonging to the family Aphrophoridae.

Species
Species:

Handschinia melanotum 
Handschinia orca 
Handschinia salomonis

References

Aphrophoridae